Thamaraikulam ("Lotus Pond") may refer to:

Thamaraikulam, Theni, a panchayat town in the Periyakulam taluk of the Theni district
Thamaraikulam, Tiruvannamalai, a municipality in the town of Tiruvannamalai
 Thamarai Kulam, a 1959 Tamil language film